Francis Joseph Ricciardone Jr. (born 1952) is a former President of the American University in Cairo. Ambassador Ricciardone was the United States ambassador to Turkey between 2011 and 2014. Previously he was Deputy Ambassador at the U.S. Embassy in Kabul, Afghanistan. He was also on leave from the U.S. Department of State as a guest scholar at the U.S. Institute of Peace. He has served as U.S. Ambassador to the Arab Republic of Egypt (2005–2008), the Republic of the Philippines and the Republic of Palau (2002–2005). As a career member of the Senior Foreign Service, he received U.S. government and other organization awards for his work in foreign policy and program management, political reporting and analysis, and peacekeeping.

Ricciardone has extensive diplomatic experience with Turkey, Iraq, Iran and Jordan. He speaks fluent Arabic, Turkish, and Italian. He has served in two multinational military deployments: as chief of the Civilian Observer Unit of the Multinational Force and Observers in Egypt's Sinai Desert, and as political advisor to the U.S. and Turkish commanding generals of Operation Provide Comfort, based in Turkey and operating in Iraq. In Washington, Ricciardone directed the Department of State's 9/11 Task Force on the Coalition Against Terrorism and served as Secretary of State Madeleine Albright's special coordinator for the Transition of Iraq (1999–2001). He also has served in the Bureau of Intelligence and Research, the Bureau of Near Eastern Affairs, and in senior management positions under the Director General of the Foreign Service and of Human Resources.

Early life and career
Ricciardone is the son of Francis Ricciardone Sr., a Seabee veteran of World War II. He graduated from Malden Catholic High School in Malden, Massachusetts.

Upon graduation summa cum laude with a BA from Dartmouth College in 1973, he received a Fulbright Scholarship for teaching and study in Italy. He went to Iran as a teacher in 1976 where he taught at the Community School, Tehran, traveling widely in Southwest Asia, Europe, and the Middle East until he entered the Foreign Service in 1978.

He speaks Italian, Turkish, Arabic and French.

AUC Presidency

Ricciardone was named president of the American University in Cairo and assumed office on July 1, 2016. Having no experience in higher education, and lacking an advanced university degree, Ricciardone's tenure was controversial. In 2016, protests erupted after Ricciardone raised tuition. In February 2019, the faculty of the American University overwhelmingly voted that they had "no confidence" in Ricciardone's leadership. According to the New York Times, the faculty members cited low morale, complaints about his management style, grievances over contracts and accusations of illegal discrimination. On Feb 10, 2019 the Board of Trustees of the American University in Cairo voted unanimously to reaffirm its “continued confidence” and “unqualified support” in Ricciardone and his administration, and extended his contract as President.  Ricciardone retired from the Presidency in June, 2021. Over the term of Ricciardone's presidency, AUC's ranking dropped from 364 to 1000, according to Times Higher Education.

Foreign service
Nominated by President George W. Bush on July 25, 2005, and confirmed by the United States Senate on July 29, 2005, Ricciardone was sworn in as United States Ambassador to Egypt on August 26, 2005.

Ricciardone was Deputy Ambassador for the American mission to Afghanistan from May 2010.

Ricciardone's nomination to be ambassador to Turkey stalled during 2010, and in late 2010, President Obama gave Ricciardone a recess appointment so he could begin serving. The U.S. Senate then confirmed Ricciardone in a voice vote on October 4, 2011.

Family
Ricciardone is married to Marie, a molecular biologist who was educated and later taught in Turkish universities during her husband's service time in Turkey. The couple has two daughters, Francesca and Chiara. Francesca was born in Turkey. Both daughters were schooled in Ankara for three years.

References

External links

Francis Ricciardone's official website
United States Embassy in Ankara: Ambassador Ricciardone's biography

"Testimony of Francis J. Ricciardone, Ambassador-Designate to the Republic of Turkey", Senate Foreign Relations Committee, July 20, 2010

Living people
Dartmouth College alumni
Ambassadors of the United States to Egypt
Ambassadors of the United States to Turkey
American people of Italian descent
Ambassadors of the United States to the Philippines
Malden Catholic High School alumni
Recess appointments
1952 births
People from Boston
Ambassadors of the United States to Palau
United States Foreign Service personnel
21st-century American diplomats